Sergio Raymundo Chávez Velasco (born March 20, 1986), better known by his ring name Niebla Roja (Spanish for "Red Mist"), is a Mexican luchador (or professional wrestler), who currently works for the Mexican wrestling promotion Consejo Mundial de Lucha Libre (CMLL). He previously worked as Ángel de Plata (Spanish for "Silver Angel") between 2008 and 2012 before adopting his current ring name. A second-generation wrestler, he is the son of retired wrestler Apolo Chávez, and the brother of Miguel Ángel Chávez Velasco, who is also a luchador under the ring name Ángel de Oro (Spanish for "Golden Angel").

Chávez has been working for CMLL since 2008. He is the current CMLL World Light Heavyweight Champion and CMLL World Tag Team Champion. He is also a former CMLL World Trios Champion as part of Los Guerreros Laguneros with Euforia and Último Guerrero. Chávez wrestled in the main event of the CMLL 84th Anniversary Show, losing the match and his mask to Gran Guerrero.

Professional wrestling career
Sergio Chávez and his younger brother Miguel, better known under the ring name Ángel de Oro, are both sons of professional wrestler Apolo Chávez and grew up idolizing their father, hoping to follow in his footsteps. He made his professional wrestling debut in 2006, under the name Guerrero Inca (Incan Warrior), as an enmascarado, or masked wrestler, working mainly in the local Gómez Palacio, Durango area. Early in his career he would often work opposite his brother as the two developed an in-ring feud without revealing that they were related. The feud led both Chávez to work for International Wrestling Revolution Group (IWRG) on opposite sides, but Sergio broke his arm in early 2008 and he did not compete for eight months.

Ángel de Plata (2008–2012)

In Durango he feuded with his younger brother, in a feud that was so well received by the crowd that the siblings received an invitation to train at Consejo Mundial de Lucha Libre's (CMLL) wrestling school in Guadalajara, Jalisco. When he went to Guadalajara to train under Gran Cochisse and El Satánico he changed his ring character to Ángel de Plata, to complement his brother's ring character. The duo made their CMLL debut on July 4, 2008 wrestling as a team dubbed Los Angeles Celestiales ("The Celestial Angels"). The duo was made into a trio when they were joined by Ángel Azteca Jr. who used a similar "Angel inspired" ring character. Los Angeles Celestiales worked low card matches throughout 2008 and into 2009, gaining valuable ring experience along the way. On April 7, 2009 Ángel de Plata participated in a 10-man Torneo cibernetico for the vacant CMLL World Super Lightweight Championship. The other participants included Ángel Azteca Jr., Rey Cometa, Pegasso, Tiger Kid, Pólvora, Inquisidor, Súper Comando, Angel de Oro and eventual winner Máscara Dorada.

In the fall of 2009 Ángel de Plata participated in the 2009 Gran Alternativa tournament, a tournament where an experienced wrestler teams up with a newcomer. Ángel de Plata teamed up with Héctor Garza and together they defeated Averno and Pólvora in the first round, before losing to eventual tournament winners La Ola Amarilla ("The Yellow Wave"; Naito and Okumura). In late 2009 Los Ángeles Celestiales participated in a tournament to crown new Mexican National Trios Champions. The team lost in the first round to Los Cancerberos del Infierno (Virus, Pólvora and Euforia. Following the tournament loss Los Ángeles Celestiales and Los Cancerberos del Infierno have developed a rivalry between the two groups, facing off on various CMLL shows, including their Friday night CMLL Super Viernes show. January 15, 2010 Super Viernes Ángel de Plata lost a Lighting match to Raziel, one of the members of Los Cancerberos del Infierno, continuing the building storyline between the two factions. Ángel de Plata was one of 12 men who put their mask on the line as part of a 12-man steel cage match in the main event of the 2010 Infierno en el Ring. During the match he tricked his brother Ángel de Oro in order to escape the match. In the end Ángel de Oro defeated Fabián el Gitano in the Lucha de Apuestas (bet match) portion of the match to unmask him. Following the match Ángel de Plata returned to the ring to celebrate with his brother, showing that there were no hard feelings over Ángel de Plata's tactics during the match.

Niebla Roja (2012–present)
On March 30, 2012, Ángel de Plata underwent a complete character overhaul, debuting a new mask and attire and switching his ring name to Niebla Roja ("Red Mist"), while also turning rudo in the process. On July 6, Niebla Roja was named the newest member of Último Guerrero's Los Guerreros del Infierno stable. Niebla Roja competed in CMLL's inaugural En Busca de un Ídolo ("In search of an Idol") tournament, but did not qualify for the semi-final. Niebla Roja was forced to team up with Dragón Rojo Jr. from Los Revolucionarios del Terror rival group for the 2013 Torneo Nacional de Parejas Increibles ("National Incredible Pairs Tournament") where the concept was that rivals would team up for a tag team tournament. Despite being rivals the duo managed to defeat the team of Rush and El Terrible in the first round and Blue Panther and Rey Escorpión in the second round. The team was defeated in the semi-finals by Niebla Rojo's stable leader Último Guerrero and Atlantis. From January 14 to 19, 2014, Roja worked the New Japan Pro-Wrestling (NJPW) and CMLL co-produced Fantastica Mania 2014 tour, which marked his debut in Japan. On March 28, 2014, Roja won his first title, when he, Euforia and Último Guerrero defeated Los Estetas del Aire (Máscara Dorada, Místico and Valiente) for the CMLL World Trios Championship. They lost the title to Sky Team (Místico, Valiente and Volador Jr.) on February 13, 2015.

Los Hermanos Chávez (2017–2020)
In March 2017, CMLL began a storyline where Niebla Roja started having problems with his fellow Los Guerreros Laguneros teammates, initially by accidentally causing them to lose matches due to miscommunication between Niebla Roja and Euforia and Gran Guerrero. As the storyline progressed Niebla Roja refused to participate in Los Guerreros rudo antics such as double or triple teaming an opponent. On May 19 Niebla Roja's tecnico turn was completed as he kicked Los Guerreros leader Último Guerrero in the face during a match. Afterwards Último Guerrero and Gran Guerrero beat Niebla Roja up, tore his mask off and demanded that Niebla Roja had to come up with a new mask instead of wearing the Último Guerrero inspired mask. During the attack he was aided by his brother Ángel de Oro. On June 10, 2017, Niebla Roja won a 10-man torneo cibernetico elimination match to win the vacant CMLL World Light Heavyweight Championship.

The long running storyline with Los Guerreros, especially Gran Guerrero led the main event of CMLL's 84th Anniversary Show on September 16, 2017. Both wrestlers put their masks on the line in a Lucha de Apuestas match, and as a result of his loss Niebla Roja was forced to unmask afterwards and state his legal name: Sergio Raymundo Chávez Velasco. After the mask loss Niebla Roja successfully defended the CMLL World Light Heavyweight Championship against Bárbaro Cavernario in the fall. As part of the 2018 Fantastica Mania tour of Japan. In the spring of 2018, Niebla Roja supported his brother in his slowly building feud with El Cuatrero, which led to Ángel de Oro also losing his mask. On July 17, 2018, Niebla Roja successfully defended the light heavyweight championship against Sansón. In late 2018, Niebla Roja began a storyline rivalry with veteran wrestler Rey Bucanero, facing each other repeatedly as Rey Bucanero often cheated to gain supremacy in their rivalry. In the end, Niebla Roja defeated Rey Bucanero in a Lucha de Apuestas match, forcing Rey Bucanero to be shaved bald as a result.

The Universal Championship was the start of a storyline between Los Hermanos Chavez and Los Ingobernables (El Terrible and La Bestia del Ring), as El Terrible cheated to defeat Niebla Roja with the help of La Bestia del Ring. After several matches between the two sides, they all signed a contract for a Luchas de Apuestas match as the main event of CMLL's 2019 Homenaje a Dos Leyendas event. On March 15, 2019, Los Hermanos Chavez defeated Los Ingobernables two falls to one, forcing both El Terrible and La Bestia del Ring to have all their hair shaved off.

Los Nuevos Ingobernables (2020–present)
In late 2020, despite being booked as tecnicos, Niebla Roja and Ángel de Oro began showing rudo tendencies, which came to a head at Leyenda de Azul. At the event, they worked with El Terrible (the last remaining member of Los Ingobernables), who helped Ángel de Oro win the cibernetico match. Afterwards, they continued to work together under the name Terriblemente Chavez, although Niebla Roja and his brother were still referred to as tecnicos. On March 24, 2021, they cemented their rudo turn and joined El Terrible, forming Los Nuevos Ingobernables. On January 23, 2022, Ángel de Oro and Niebla Roja won the CMLL World Tag Team Championship.

Personal life
Chávez is father to a son with his partner, Grace.

Championships and accomplishments
Consejo Mundial de Lucha Libre
CMLL World Light Heavyweight Championship (1 time, current)
CMLL World Tag Team Championship (1 time, current) - with Ángel de Oro
CMLL World Trios Championship (1 time) – with Euforia and Último Guerrero
Copa Dinastías (2019) – with Ángel de Oro
La Copa Junior (2017 VIP)
Lucha Libre Voz
Voz Ultra Championship (1 time, current)
Pro Wrestling Illustrated
Ranked No. 139 of the top 500 singles wrestlers in the PWI 500 in 2020

Lucha de Apuestas record

Footnotes

References

1986 births
Living people
Masked wrestlers
Mexican male professional wrestlers
Professional wrestlers from Coahuila
People from Torreón
CMLL World Light Heavyweight Champions
21st-century professional wrestlers
CMLL World Tag Team Champions
CMLL World Trios Champions